Norton is an area in the eastern part of the town of Runcorn, Cheshire, England.

History
In the Domesday Book, Norton (spelt as Nortune) was held as two manors.  The major event in the early history of the settlement came in 1134 when William fitz William, the third Baron of Halton, moved a community of canons from a site near Runcorn Gap to a site near the village to found Norton Priory.  In 1888–92 Norton Water Tower was built to the south of the village as a balancing reservoir on the water pipeline between Lake Vyrnwy in North Wales and Liverpool.  Norton remained a small community until the growth of the new town.

Present day
The area is currently residential and is divided into two electoral wards.  Norton North has a population of 6,494, and Norton South of 7,227.

See also
Listed buildings in Runcorn (urban area)

References

Sources

Runcorn